Searl is a surname. Notable people with the surname include:

Doug Searl (born 1947), Australian rules footballer
Jackie Searl (1921–1991), American child actor
Madeline Searl (born 1994), Australian footballer
Nina Searl (1883–1955), British psychoanalyst
Sid Searl (1917–2000), Australian rules footballer

See also
Searle (disambiguation)
Searles (disambiguation)
Searls
Serle
Serles